The fourth season of Eesti otsib superstaari  premiered on February 13, 2011, on TV3. The show was won by Liis Lemsalu.

On 9 December 2010, Mihkel Raud, one of the judges, said on his Twitter account, that the fourth season starts in the beginning of 2011. 
On December 13, it was confirmed by TV3.

There were no changes in the judges' panel. The judges were Mihkel Raud, Maarja-Liis Ilus and Rein Rannap.  The hosts for the fourth season were two actresses, Hele Kõrve and Evelin Pang.
 
Liis Lemsalu, the winner of the show, was awarded with €10,000 and a record contract with the Universal Music. The show is followed by a tour "Eesti superstaar - Live tuur" around Estonia in June 2011.

Auditions
Auditions for 2011 season were held in Pärnu (January 16), Tallinn (January 22–23), Tartu (January 29-
30) and Jõhvi (February 6, 2011). Only 60 singers were given the 'yellow cards' and qualified to the theatre rounds.

Theatre rounds
As only 20 of the sixty participants were male, all boys automatically qualified to the second round. Twenty-two girls qualified to the second round.

In the second round, participants were divided into 21 duos. Duos performed either Ott Lepland and Lenna Kuurmaa's "Sinuni" or James Morrison and Nelly Furtado's "Broken Strings". After second round, all the participants were divided into three groups named "Yes", "Maybe" and "No". People in groups "Yes" and "Maybe" qualified to the third round.

In the third round, girls were given a choice to sing either Janis Joplin's "Piece of My Heart" or Katy Perry's "Firework". Boys chose between Koit Toome's "Mälestused", Robbie Williams' "Let Me Entertain You" and Kings of Leon's "Use Somebody". Ten male and ten female participants advanced to the semi-finals aka studio rounds.

Semi-finals aka Studio rounds
The studio rounds took place on March 27, April 3 and 10. In the first studio round 10 girls performed and in the second 10 boys performed. After nationwide televote, three participants from each semi-final qualified to the finals. The judges chose 10 participants from the first two rounds to the third round. Televoters voted three of them to the finals. Tenth finalist was chosen by the judges as a wildcard.

First week
Girls' round took place on March 27, 2011.

 Marit Kesa – "Usu ometi" by Mahavok
 Triin Niitoja – "Whataya Want from Me" by Adam Lambert
 Katrin-Merili Poom – "Lost" by Anouk
 Raahel Pilpak – "Poker Face" by Lady Gaga
 Liis Lemsalu – "Vanaisa kiri" by Indigolapsed
 Marilyn Ollep – "Not as We" by Alanis Morissette
 Reilika Saks – "Howl" by Florence and the Machine
 Rosanna Lints – "The Voice Within" by Christina Aguilera
 Liis Reisner – "Pühendus" by Tõnis Mägi
 Teele Viira – "Sex on Fire" by Kings of Leon

 Advanced to the final: Triin Niitoja, Rosanna Lints, Teele Viira   
Advanced to the second chance semi-final (jury's choice): Katri-Merili Poom, Liis Lemsalu, Liis Reisner, Marilyn Ollep, Marit Kesa, Raahel Pilpak

Second week
Boys' week took place on April 3, 2011.

 Indrek Rebane – "Eternity" by Robbie Williams
 Mikk Tivas – "You Found Me" by The Fray
 Taavi Kendra – "Love Me Or Not" by Dub FX
 Leemet Onno –  "What Are Words" by Chris Medina
 Kevin Johannson – "Say You Don't Want It" by One Night Only
 Jaan Lehepuu – "Saatanlik naine" (Devil Woman) by Jaak Joala
 Lauri Antsov – "Neutron Star Collision" by Muse
 Artjom Savitski – "The Kill" by Thirty Seconds to Mars
 Imre Saarna – "Hello" by Lionel Richie
 Dario Hoffren – Withdrew

 Advanced to the final: Leemet Onno, Jaan Lehepuu, Imre Saarna   
Advanced to the second chance semi-final (jury's choice): Artjom Savitski, Kevin Johannson, Lauri Atsov, Mikk Tivas

Third week
The second chance semi-final took place on April 10, 2011. Four of them qualified.

 Lauri Antsov – "Rapunzel" by Lenna Kuurmaa
 Raahel Pilpak – "Sind otsides" by Mikronid
 Kevin Johannson – "Jäljed" by Tõnis Mägi
 Marit Kesa – "Don't Let The Sun Go Down On Me" by Elton John
 Marilyn Ollep – "Vaiki kui võid" by Ruja
 Mikk Tivas – "Tule kui leebe tuul" by Henry Laks
 Liis Reisner – "In My Defence" by Freddie Mercury
 Katrin-Merili Poom – "Kaunilt kaua" by Tõnis Mägi
 Liis Lemsalu – "At Last" by Etta James
 Artjom Savitski – "Nii vaikseks kõik on jäänud" by Ruja

 Advanced to the finals: Liis Lemsalu, Kevin Johannson, Artjom Savitski 
Advanced to the finals (jury's choice): Katrin-Merili Poom

Finals

Week 1
The first final show took place on 17 April 2011. The theme of the show was "Big songs". Participants sang the biggest hits of all time.

Week 2
The second final show took place on 24 April 2011. Participants sang songs in Estonian.

Week 3
The third final show takes place on May 1, 2011. The finalists are singing dance tracks from the 1970s and 1980s.

Week 4
The fourth final show took place on May 8, 2011. The finalists sang songs from world's biggest superstars of all time.

Week 5
The fifth final show took place on May 15, 2011. Contestants sang Big band songs with Bel-Etage Orchestra.

Week 6
The sixth final show took place on May 22, 2011. Contestants sang a hit from their year of birth and a song which is composed or has been performed by one of the judges.

Week 7
The seventh final show took place on May 29, 2011. Contestants sang a song composed by Hendrik Sal-Saller and a song in foreign language (other than Estonian and English).

Week 8
The eight final show took place on June 5, 2011. Contestants sang a song about love and a celebrity duet.

Celebrity duets:
 Liis Lemsalu with Oliver Kuusik
 Artjom Savitski with Hele Kõre
 Rosanna Lints with Tõnis Mägi

Super-final
The super-final show took place on June 12, 2011. Contestants sang their favourite song they had performed before in the show, a patriotic song and a "winner" song.

Elimination chart

Ratings

External links
 Official website
 TV3 Internet TV – Eesti otsib superstaari channel

References

2011 Estonian television seasons
2010s Estonian television series
Season 04